Mount Martha is a suburb on the Mornington Peninsula in Melbourne, Victoria, Australia,  south-east of Melbourne's Central Business District, located within the Shire of Mornington Peninsula local government area. Mount Martha recorded a population of 19,846 at the 2021 census.

Mount Martha is located on the south-eastern shores of Port Phillip and offers a bathing beach. A boardwalk winds its way for more than  along the Balcombe Creek, its North beach mouth to the Briars Historic Park. The suburb's highest point bears the area's name and reaches . The peak was named in 1836 after Captain William Hobson's mother, Martha Jones.

It marks the start of the Selwyn fault, a geological formation which runs to the eastern Dandenong Ranges.

History

Mount Martha has its roots dating back to the 1840s when the township's major role was that of farming. The homestead was named after the lodging of the same name in Saint Helena. Dame Mabel Brookes collected Napoleonic memorabilia which was also donated to the Mornington Peninsula shire; some is on display at the house.

In 1890, the Martha Hotel, designed by architects Tappin, Gilbert and Dennehy was constructed in a Federation Queen Anne style. Today, the building now known as Mt. Martha House serves as a community centre and is Victorian Heritage listed. As the population grew, Mount Martha Post Office opened around 1902.

During the Second World War, Mount Martha's Balcombe Creek camp hosted the United States Marine Corps's 1st Marine Division in late 1942 following their involvement in the Battle of Guadalcanal. After the conclusion of the war, it was progressively relocated or demolished until 1999. The area is now known as Balcombe Estuary and has barbecue facilities (including an open fireplace) as well as a children's play area in the west, and residential allocations were made in the east. Also during the Second World War, Mount Martha House had extensive use by the military and functioned as a Women's Royal Australian Army Corps (WRAAC) barracks up until 1978.

In 1978, a water treatment plant was constructed in the town's east.  It services the nearby suburbs of Mornington, Mount Eliza, Mount Martha, Somerville, Pearcedale and Baxter, and provides treated water to local vineyards, a tree plantation and lawns.

Present day

More recently from the 1990s to the present the Mount Martha area has experienced significant population growth particularly in the south with the Martha Cove marina development as well as east towards the Moorooduc Highway. This has led to the area being incredibly crowded in Summer, with little or no areas to park.

Mount Martha is home to a volunteer CFA fire brigade responding on average to 180 calls a year for assistance from the community. Incidents range from grass and scrub fires, motor vehicle accidents, to house fires.

Martha Cove, a large inland harbour and residential development in Safety Beach, was named after its location in the cove at the foot of Mount Martha. The project, which began in 2004, was initially heavily protested by residents. After experiencing considerable financial difficulties, Martha Cove recovered and became a thriving residential community.

Transport

Peninsula Link and the Mornington Peninsula Freeway are both major arterial routes to both Mount Martha and the Mornington Peninsula, from Melbourne (via the EastLink tollway).

Sport

Mount Martha volunteer Surf Lifesaving Club holds the popular annual Mount Martha Australia Day Swim, the "MMAD Swim". Golfers play at the course of the Mount Martha Golf Club on Forest Drive. Mount Martha is also home to public tennis courts, four football ovals and numerous grass reserves.

Mornington Peninsula Pony Club provides dressage, show jumping and cross-country facilities for young equestrian enthusiasts.  The club is affiliated with the Pony Club Association of Victoria.

Notable people
 Liz Egan
 George Calombaris
 Drew Morphett
 Tones and I
 Mary Sophia Alston

See also
 Shire of Mornington – Mount Martha was previously within this former local government area.

References

 Visitor.com.au
 Australia at war
 Shire Information Website for Mount Martha
 South East Water
 History of Mt. Martha House
 Images of Frankston & Mornington Peninsula, Alexandra & Barry Stevens, Gippstar International, Yallorn North, Victoria - (p70- 72)

External links
Mount Martha Fire Brigade

Suburbs of Melbourne
Suburbs of the Shire of Mornington Peninsula